The 2016 Wyoming State Senate election were held on November 8, 2016, with the primary election on August 16, 2016. Voters in the 15 districts of the Wyoming Senate elected their representatives. The elections coincided with the elections for other offices, including for U.S. President and the state assembly.

Overview

Results

District 2

District 4

District 6

District 8

District 10

District 12

District 14

District 16

District 18

District 20

District 22

District 24

District 26

District 28

District 30

References

State Senate
Wyoming State Senate elections
Wyoming State Senate